Outokumpu is a town and municipality of Finland. The most important road connection in the locality is Highway 9.

Neighbouring municipalities are Heinävesi, Kaavi, Liperi, Polvijärvi and Tuusniemi. The municipality is unilingually Finnish.

The fir-twigged line in the coat of arms of Outokumpu refers to the name Kuusjärvi (literally "spruce lake") at the time the municipality's coat of arms was established, and the copper symbol refers to Outokumpu Oyj's mines, which later gave their name to the entire township. The coat of arms was designed by Olof Eriksson, and the Kuusjärvi municipal council approved it at its meeting on November 21, 1952. The Ministry of the Interior approved the coat of arms for use on February 18, 1953.

History

The municipality was formerly known as Kuusjärvi. In 1968 it became a market town and was renamed as Outokumpu after the copper mine located in the municipality. Outokumpu gained town privileges in 1977. The town began to form around the Outokumpu Copper Mine, which was active between 1913-1989. The old mining area is still clearly visible as it is situated in the town centre and nowadays it has been developed into a tourist attraction.

Economy
The steel manufacturer Outokumpu originates from the town of Outokumpu. Outokumpu Copper Mine was a big employer in Outokumpu from the beginning of 20th century until 1989 when the ore was shut down.

In Outokumpu there is a rather vibrant industrial park, which was founded in 1979 when it became apparent that the mine was to be shut down during the next decade. Most of the town's biggest employers are situated in Outokumpu Industrial Park as it has the role of organizing and developing the local businesses.

Nowadays Outokumpu is home to many technology industry companies such as Outotec Turula workshop, Finelcomp Oy, Okun Hammaspyörä Oy, Okun Koneistuspalvelu Oy and Outokummun Metalli Oy. It is said that in Outokumpu there is one of the highest densities of CNC machines and tools in Finland compared to population.

Relevant employers from other branches of the economy include among others: Piippo Oyj, Mondo Minerals, HK Scan Finland.

There was some 2502 jobs in Outokumpu in 2014.

Tourism 
Main tourist attraction in Outokumpu is the Outokumpu Old Mine. An area where you can find a mining museum, theme park Children's mine for children, some restaurants and a Disc golf track that surrounds the old mining area.

Other destinations of interest are the Outokumpu Nature Park, Keretti Golf track (in an old mining area), lake Juojärvi and the municipal Sports and Swimming Centre.

During summer season you can go for a canoe trip on the small and beautiful lakes surrounding the Outokumpu Nature Park. You can also go fishing in Children's fishing Oasis and rent a beach sauna from touristic services.

Culture

Food 
In the 1980s, meat soup called kaivossoppa ("mine soup") and rye-lingonberry porridge were named as Outokumpu's traditional parish dishes.

International relations

Twin towns — Sister cities
 Kohtla-Järve, Estonia
Schöningen, Germany

See also
 Lieksa
 Pyhäjärvi
 Siilinjärvi

References

External links

Town of Outokumpu – Official website

Cities and towns in Finland
Mining towns in Finland